Joey Antipas is a Zimbabwean football coach.

Career
Antipas won the Zimbabwean domestic league with Motor Action in 2010 and Chicken Inn in 2015.  In May 2016, he became the manager of South African club AmaZulu, but was sacked in August 2017. He then became the caretaker manager of the Zimbabwe national team in August 2019. On 30 January 2020, Antipas was named as assistant to newly-appointed Zimbabwean national team manager Zdravko Logarusic.

Antipas returned to Chicken Inn on 16 January 2020. He was demoted in January 2023.

References

Living people
Zimbabwean football managers
Zimbabwe national football team managers
Year of birth missing (living people)
Zimbabwean expatriate football managers
Zimbabwean expatriates in South Africa
Expatriate soccer managers in South Africa
AmaZulu F.C. managers